This is a list of acts of the Parliament of South Africa enacted in the years 1920 to 1929.

South African acts are uniquely identified by the year of passage and an act number within that year. Some acts have gone by more than one short title in the course of their existence; in such cases each title is listed with the years in which it applied.

1920

1921

1922

1923

1924

1925

1926

1927

1928

1929

References
 Government Gazette of the Union of South Africa, Volumes XXXIX–LXXVII.
 

1920